BYD or Byd may refer to:

Companies
 BYD Company, an automobile and rechargeable battery producer in China
 BYD Auto, a subsidiary automobile manufacturer in China
 BYD Electronic, a subsidiary handset component and mobile phone manufacturer
 Boyd Gaming, a gaming and hospitality company (NYSE ticker symbol: BYD)

Other uses
 Barley yellow dwarf, a plant disease caused by the barley yellow dwarf virus
 Barry Docks railway station (National Rail station code), Wales
 Y Byd, a Welsh-language newspaper
 Bury Your Dead, American rock band

See also
 Byrd (disambiguation)
 Boyd (disambiguation)
 Beyond (disambiguation)